William Hartston FRCP (26 November 1904 – 1 July 1980) was an English physician and president of the History of Medicine Society of the Royal Society of Medicine from 1973 to 1975.  He was a chest physician and lecturer for DHMSA.

References 

Presidents of the History of Medicine Society
Fellows of the Royal College of Physicians
20th-century English medical doctors
1904 births
1980 deaths